Tom Glocer (born October 8, 1959) is an American business executive and the former CEO of Thomson Reuters and Reuters.

Biography

He is a co-founder and executive chairman of BlueVoyant and Capitolis, cyber defense and fintech start-ups, respectively. He is also a partner in Communitas Capital, an early stage venture fund focusing on investments in financial technology and marketplaces, and the Chairman of ISTARI, a new type of cyber risk management company. 

Glocer is a director of Merck & Co., Morgan Stanley (Lead Director), and Publicis Groupe; a member and former director of the Council on Foreign Relations; a trustee of the Cleveland Clinic; a member of, the President's Council on International Activities at Yale University, the Yale Law School Executive Committee, the Yale School of Management Council, the Columbia University Global Center (Paris) Board, the Atlantic Council, the International Tennis Hall of Fame Board, the European Business Leaders Council, and the Madison Council of the Library of Congress.

Glocer stepped down from Thomson Reuters at the end of 2011, and is now managing partner of Angelic Ventures, LP, a family office investing in fintech, media, “big data” and healthcare, e.g. Windward. He is also an advisory board member of Afiniti, an American big data and artificial intelligence business. He held a number of senior leadership positions at Reuters, including president of Reuters LatAm and Reuters America, before being named CEO of Reuters Group PLC in July 2001. Before joining Reuters, initially the legal department in 1993, he had worked as a merger and acquisitions lawyer for American law firm Davis Polk & Wardwell in New York, Paris and Tokyo.

Glocer holds a bachelor's degree in political science from Columbia University and a J.D. from Yale Law School. He is married to Finnish model  with two children and lives in New York City.

References

External links
 Tom Glocer's blog

1959 births
Living people
Columbia College (New York) alumni
Yale Law School alumni
20th-century American businesspeople
American chief executives of financial services companies
Directors of Morgan Stanley
Thomson Reuters people
Davis Polk & Wardwell lawyers
Merck & Co. people
American venture capitalists
American businesspeople
American company founders